Jacob Alexander Elshin (December 30, 1892 – 1976) was a Russian American artist. Born in Saint Petersburg, Russia, he served as an officer in the Imperial Russian Army, and may have been a student at the St. Petersburg Academy. He arrived in Seattle in 1923 where he was described as a "straight pictorialist". His art was commissioned by the Works Progress Administration's Federal Art Project, where he worked with Mark Tobey, Helmi Juvonen, and others.  He also provided services to the U.S. Treasury Department's Section of Painting and Sculpture. Elshin socialized with other artists at the Chinese Art Club. He died in Seattle in 1976.

References

Bibliography
 
 
 

1892 births
1976 deaths
Painters from Washington (state)
Artists from Seattle
Emigrants from the Russian Empire to the United States
Section of Painting and Sculpture artists
20th-century American painters
American male painters
American muralists
Federal Art Project artists
20th-century American male artists